Greenbush Township may refer to:
 Greenbush Township, Warren County, Illinois
 Greenbush Township, Alcona County, Michigan
 Greenbush Township, Clinton County, Michigan
 Greenbush Township, Mille Lacs County, Minnesota
 Greenbush Township, Ward County, North Dakota, in Ward County, North Dakota

Township name disambiguation pages